The Valley Central School District serves most of the Town of Montgomery in Orange County, New York, United States, and its three villages: Maybrook, Montgomery and Walden. Students also come from adjacent areas of the towns of Newburgh, Crawford, Wallkill, Hamptonburgh, and New Windsor. A small portion of Ulster County's Town of Shawangunk also sends students to this district.
There is also another school named Valley Central Public School in Thunder Bay, Ontario, Canada.

It operates six schools:

Berea Elementary School

East Coldenham Elementary School

Montgomery Elementary School
Montgomery Elementary School is located on Union Street (NY 211) in the village of Montgomery, New York, United States. It educates children from grades kindergarten through 5, most of them residents of the village or nearby sections of the Town of Montgomery.

It is a Colonial Revival-style brick building dating to the 1920s. When it was built it was the school for all ages in the village, but became an elementary school when the district was created in the late 1950s.

In 2008 it was named a high-performing/gap closing school under the reporting requirements of the No Child Left Behind Act. Fifth-graders go on to Valley Central Middle School.
This school has 1 courtyard and a garden. It has 2 playgrounds 1 for grades K-2 and 1 for 3-5.

Walden Elementary School
Walden Elementary School educates children from kindergarten through fifth grade in the village of the same name, and adjacent areas of the surrounding Town of Montgomery.

The building itself was opened in 1926 as the single school building for what was then the Walden School District, educating students of all grade levels from the village, a purpose still evident from the "Walden Grade-High School" entablature on the pediment above the four Corinthian order columns at the main entrance. When Valley Central was created from the merger of Walden and two neighboring districts in the late 1950s, it became just one of three (later five, now four) elementary schools in the district.

The school was at the center of a small controversy in 2007. On November 15, an employee at the school received a bomb threat in email. School officials locked down the building, letting police enter and confining students to their rooms until an hour after their normal dismissal time. Parents who had objected to the school's decision, and its failure to notify them, kept a quarter of the students home the next day as a protest. School district officials defended their actions as required by the situation.

Valley Central Middle School

Valley Central High School
See Valley Central High School

Other facilities
A seventh school, Maybrook Elementary School, closed in June 2013. It is now called the Alternative Learning Center and is used for special learning programs and other small parent enrichment programs. The District Office is located on the same property as Berea Elementary.  All business office and Board of Education functions are performed there.

References

External links
 

School districts in New York (state)
Education in Orange County, New York